Riilio "Rio" Rii (born 26 June 1994) is a Vanuatuan rower. He was the flagbearer of Vanuatu at the 2020 Summer Olympics in Tokyo, earning attention for his shirtless, oiled get-up compared to Tongan fighter Pita Taufatofua. In the men's single sculls race, Rii finished 30th overall.

Career 
He started at the sport at 19, having taken up cricket before, and has won a gold medal at the Commonwealth Rowing Championships, as well as appearing at three World Rowing Championships.

References

External links
 

1994 births
Vanuatuan male rowers
Olympic rowers of Vanuatu
Living people
Rowers at the 2020 Summer Olympics